Adam Maher (2 August 1972 – 25 February 2020) was an Australian professional rugby league player. He played six games for the Cronulla Sharks during the 1994 NSWRL season. Four years later, Maher started a playing career in the United Kingdom, representing Rochdale Hornets (1998), Gateshead Thunder (1999) and most notably Hull F.C. (2000–03). During his time at Hull, he made 100 appearances for the Super League  club, scoring 25 tries.

In late 2018, Maher was diagnosed with motor neurone disease. He died on 25 February 2020, at the age of 47.

References

1972 births
2020 deaths
Australian expatriate rugby league players
Cronulla-Sutherland Sharks players
Deaths from motor neuron disease
Neurological disease deaths in Australia
Gateshead Thunder (1999) players
Hull F.C. players
Rochdale Hornets players